Maureen Batt is a Canadian soprano concert and opera artist. She also holds a position on the Board of Directors for the Canadian Music Centre.

Education 
Batt holds a Master of Music from the University of Toronto, a Bachelor of Music from Dalhousie University, and a Bachelor of Arts from St. Thomas University. She is also an alumna of the St. Andrews Opera by the Sea workshop, the Halifax Summer Opera Workshop, the Casalmaggiore International Music Festival, the Daniel Ferro Vocal Program in Italy, and the Centre for Opera Studies in Italy.

Career 
In 2010 Batt founded the opera company Essential Opera in Toronto with fellow soprano Erin Bardua. The company's mission includes presenting works both old and new, focusing on core values of equity, diversity, and inclusion.

In 2015 Batt founded a contemporary Western art music recital series Crossing Borders which has toured through the United States, Canada, and Colombia.

Discography 
 Lady of the Lake (2017)
 Lighthouse (2021)
 Aunt Helen (2021)
 Mirror, Mirror (2021)
  Durme, Durme: Four Ladino Folk Songs (2023)

Awards and Nominations 

{| class="wikitable"
! scope="row" |Year
! scope="row" |Organization
! scope="row" |Work
! scope="row" |Award
!Result
! scope="row" |
|-
|2018
|East Coast Music Awards
|Lady of the Lake
|Classical Recording of the Year
|
|style="text-align:center;" |
|-
|-
|2021
|Music Nova Scotia Awards 
|Aunt Helen
|Classical Recording of the Year
|
| style="text-align:center;" |
|-
|-
|2022
|Juno Awards
|Saman Shahi, Breathing in the Shadows (ft. Maureen Batt)
|Classical Composition of the Year
|
| style="text-align:center;" |
|-
|-
|2022
|East Coast Music Awards
|Maureen Batt & Grej, Lighthouse
|Classical Recording of the Year
|
| style="text-align:center;" |
|-
|-
|2022
|Music Nova Scotia Awards 
|Maureen Batt & Grej, Lighthouse
|Classical Recording of the Year
|
| style="text-align:center;" |
|-

References

1981 births
Living people
Canadian operatic sopranos
21st-century Canadian women opera singers
Academic staff of the University of British Columbia
Musicians from Halifax, Nova Scotia